The Abava Valley is the valley of the Abava River in Talsi, Tukums, and Kuldīga municipalities, Latvia, in the historical Kurzeme region.

Following inclusion on the World Monuments Fund's Watch List of endangered heritage sites, on 20 June 1996 the Republic of Latvia designated the Abava Valley as specially protected cultural territory and on 03/01/2005 it was submitted for inclusion in the UNESCO World Heritage List.

The valley is the route of the historical road from Riga to Prussia and Northern Germany, and as such, it is rich in historical and cultural monuments.  In its vicinity there are 16 protected nature monuments, such as Devil's Stone, Devil's Cave and Chambers of Mara, five rocks, seven rapids and three historical estate parks.

References

Nature parks in Latvia
Valleys of Latvia